Moonlight consists of mostly sunlight (with little earthlight) reflected from the parts of the Moon's surface where the Sun's light strikes.

Illumination
The intensity of moonlight varies greatly depending on the lunar phase, but even the full moon typically provides only about 0.05–0.1 lux illumination. When a full Moon around perigee (a "supermoon") is viewed around upper culmination from the tropics, the illuminance can reach up to 0.32 lux. From Earth, the apparent magnitude of the full Moon is only about  that of the Sun.

The color of moonlight, particularly around full moon, appears bluish to the human eye compared to other, brighter light sources due to the Purkinje effect. The blue or silver appearance of the light is an illusion. 

The Moon's bond albedo averages 0.136, meaning only 13.6% of incident sunlight is reflected from the lunar surface. Moonlight takes approximately 1.26 seconds to reach Earth's surface. Scattered in Earth's atmosphere, moonlight generally increases the brightness of the night sky, reducing contrast between dimmer stars and the background. For this reason, many astronomers usually avoid observing sessions around a full moon.

Gallery

Folklore
In folklore, moonlight sometimes has a harmful influence. For example, sleeping in the light of a full Moon on certain nights was said to transform a person into a werewolf. The light of the Moon was thought to worsen the symptoms of lunatics, and to sleep in moonlight could make one blind, or mad. Nyctalopia (night blindness caused by a lack of vitamin A) was thought to be caused by sleeping in moonlight in the tropics.

"Moon blindness" is a name for equine recurrent uveitis. Moonlight is no longer thought of as the cause.

In the 16th century, moonmilk, a soft white limestone precipitate found in caves, was thought to be caused by the rays of the Moon.

Art

In 2008 Katie Paterson produced an artwork titled Light bulb to Simulate Moonlight. It consists of 289 lightbulbs coated to produce a similar spectrum to the light of the full Moon.

See also

Airglow
Daylight
Diffuse reflection
Earthlight (astronomy)
Lunar effect
Scotobiology
Starlight
Night in paintings (Western art)
Night in paintings (Eastern art)

References

External links

 Phases of the Moon  at USNO
 Strange Moonlight at Science@NASA
 Moonlight Brightness at LunarLight Photography

Lunar observation
Light
Light sources
Light